Ludwig "Lutz" Templin (June 18, 1901, Düsseldorf - March 7, 1973, Stuttgart) was a German jazz bandleader.

Templin played violin and saxophone, and studied composition before finding work playing and arranging in dance ensembles. From 1941 to 1949 he led a big band in Germany which recorded extensively and was broadcast on German radio. This ensemble also recorded as "Charlie and his Orchestra", doing arrangements of American jazz hits with propagandistic lyrics inserted; these were broadcast on Nazi radio stations. Templin's ensemble operated out of Berlin until 1943, when Allied bombing resulted in their relocation to Stuttgart. Templin remained in Stuttgart after the war and continued performing there for most of the rest of his life.

References
"Lutz Templin". The New Grove Dictionary of Jazz, 1994, p. 1195.

German jazz bandleaders
Musicians from Düsseldorf
1901 births
1973 deaths
20th-century German musicians